Outrageous is the third album by American singer-songwriter Kim Fowley, released in 1968 through Imperial Records.

Release and reception 

Outrageous is perhaps the most renowned of Fowley's solo output and is his only album to chart on the United States' Billboard 200. In January 2003 Julian Cope selected it as the album of the month, calling it "a shamanic rock’n’roll album made by the ultimate chancer/huckster/gleeman." Rob Fitzpatrick of the Guardian named the album one of the "101 strangest records on Spotify," writing that:  Less enthusiastic was music journalist Robert Christgau, who rated it "E", his second-worst rating (on a scale of A+ to E-), and stated, "I don't understand how he continues to earn a living, but he does." (Fowley eventually did earn an E- from Christgau for his 1972 release I'm Bad.)

Track listing

Chart positions

Personnel 

Musicians
Kim Fowley – additional vocals, keyboards, record producer
Michael Allsup – guitar
Ben "Blues" Benay – guitar, harmonica
Mars Bonfire – guitar
Jimmy Greenspoon – keyboards
Eddie Hoh – percussion
Orville "Red" Rhodes – steel guitar
Carmen Riale – bass guitar
Joe Schermie – bass guitar
Wayne Talbert – keyboards
Joe Torres – percussion

Production and additional personnel
David Brand – engineering
Ed Caraeff – photography
Bruce Ellison – engineering
Gabor Halmos – design
Woody Woodward – art direction

References

External links 
 

1968 albums
Imperial Records albums
Kim Fowley albums
Albums produced by Kim Fowley